Ryan Lexer (ראין לקסר; born March 15, 1976) is an American-Israeli former basketball player. He played the power forward and center positions. He played in the Israeli Basketball Premier League in 1998 to 2008.

Biography
Lexer is from Philadelphia, Pennsylvania, where he attended Council Rock High School North, and is Jewish. He is 6' 9" (204 cm) tall.

He attended Towson University ('97), and played for the Towson Tigers from 1994 to 1998. In 1996-97 Lexer  was 10th in the America East Conference in free throw percentage, at .743.

Lexer  played basketball for Team USA in the 1997 Maccabiah Games.

He played in the Israeli Basketball Premier League in 1998 to 2008, for Hapoel Holon, Hapoel Jerusalem, Maccabi Hadera, Maccabi Haifa, and Maccabi Petach Tikvah.

As of 2020 Lexer  was Head of Sales and Business Development at KIDOZ Inc.

References

External links
Facebook page
"Keeping online safe with Ryan Lexer of Kidoz," podcast, June 5, 2018.

1976 births
Living people
21st-century American Jews
American men's basketball players
Basketball players from Pennsylvania
Centers (basketball)
Competitors at the 1997 Maccabiah Games
Hapoel Holon players
Hapoel Jerusalem B.C. players
Israeli men's basketball players
Israeli people of American-Jewish descent
Jewish American sportspeople
Jewish Israeli sportspeople
Jewish men's basketball players
Maccabiah Games basketball players of the United States
Maccabi Haifa B.C. players
Power forwards (basketball)
Sportspeople from Philadelphia
Towson Tigers men's basketball players